The 2015 Norwich City Council election took place on 7 May 2015 to elect approximately one third of the members of Norwich City Council in England. This was on the same day as other local elections and the UK general election. Thirteen seats were due to be contested, with a further two seats up for election where casual vacancies had arisen. Labour won ten of the available seats, the Green Party won four, and the Liberal Democrats one. The Conservatives gained their highest ever vote in many city wards including Town Close and Thorpe Hamlet, and across Norwich came within almost 2000 votes of the Green Party, however failed to gain any seats.  Just one seat changed hands - Wensum - which Labour gained from the Greens. Labour retained overall control of the council with 22 seats out of 39, the Greens continue to form the main opposition with 14 seats, and the Liberal Democrats have 3.

All changes in vote share are calculated with reference to the 2011 election, the last time these seats were contested.

Overall result

|-bgcolor=#F6F6F6
| colspan=2 style="text-align: right; margin-right: 1em" | Total
| style="text-align: right;" | 15
| colspan=4 style="text-align: right;" |Turnout
| style="text-align: right;" | 62.0
| style="text-align: right;" | 65,263
| style="text-align: right;" | 
|-
|}

Changes in vote share are relative to the last time these seats were contested in 2011.

Ward Results

Below are the ward results for Norwich's 13 wards. All the ward are elected one councillor apart from Sewell and Mile Cross ward, who both elected two councillors. Changes in vote share shown are changes from the result for these seats in the 2011 City Council election.

Bowthorpe

Catton Grove

Crome

Eaton

Lakenham

Mancroft

Mile Cross

Mile Cross ward elected two seats in this election, with each voter casting up to two votes under the plurality-at-large voting system.

Nelson

Sewell

Sewell ward elected two seats in this election, with each voter casting up to two votes under the plurality-at-large voting system.

Thorpe Hamlet

Town Close

University

Wensum

References

2015 English local elections
May 2015 events in the United Kingdom
2015
2010s in Norfolk